The Prospector's Vengeance is a 1920 American short silent Western film directed by B. Reeves Eason.

Cast
 George Field 
 Mildred Moore
 Pat O'Malley
 Harry Myers
 Tote Du Crow
 Charles Newton

References

External links
 

1920 films
1920 Western (genre) films
1920 short films
American silent short films
American black-and-white films
Films directed by B. Reeves Eason
Silent American Western (genre) films
Universal Pictures short films
1920s American films